Blood is the third and final album released by 4AD collective This Mortal Coil, an umbrella title for a loose grouping of guest musicians and vocalists brought together by label co-founder Ivo Watts-Russell. The supergroup consists primarily of artists attached to the 4AD label, of which Watts-Russell was boss and president at the time. The double album was released in April 1991, and was the second release on 4AD to utilize the double album-identifier "DAD" prefix in its catalog number.

Blood was the final LP in the project's history, although Watts-Russell used two TMC performers on his next project, The Hope Blister, in 1998. A remastered and repackaged CD edition of Blood was issued with the complete This Mortal Coil recordings in a self-titled box set, released in late November 2011. The CD was released individually shortly thereafter.

In 2013, NME ranked the album at number 493 in its list of The 500 Greatest Albums of All Time.

Track listing

Credits
Personnel as printed in the liner notes:
 "The Lacemaker"
Voices: Caroline Crawley, Deirdre Rutkowski
Music: Ivo Watts-Russell
Strings: Martin McCarrick, Jocelyn Pook, Sally Herbert, Sonia Slaney
Programming: John Fryer
 "Mr Somewhere"
Voice: Caroline Crawley
Music: Jon Turner
Cello: Martin McCarrick
 "Andialu"
Voice: Alison Limerick
Music: Ivo Watts-Russell, John Fryer
 "With Tomorrow"
Voice: Deirdre Rutkowski
Music: Jon Turner
 "Loose Joints"
Music: Ivo Watts-Russell
Strings: Martin McCarrick, Jocelyn Pook, Sally Herbert, Sonia Slaney
Programming: John Fryer
 "You and Your Sister"
Voices: Kim Deal, Tanya Donelly
Music: Jon Turner
Strings: Martin McCarrick, Jocelyn Pook, Sally Herbert, Sonia Slaney
 "Nature's Way"
Voices: Alison Limerick, Deirdre Rutkowski
Strings: Martin McCarrick, Jocelyn Pook, Sally Herbert, Sonia Slaney
 "I Come and Stand at Every Door"
Voices: Louise Rutkowski, Deirdre Rutkowski, Tim Freeman
Violin: Gini Ball
Music: Ivo Watts-Russell
Programming: John Fryer
 "Bitter"
Voices: Ikuko Kozu, Alison Limerick, Deirdre Rutkowski
Music: Ivo Watts-Russell
Guitar: Jim Williams
Strings: Martin McCarrick, Jocelyn Pook, Sally Herbert, Sonia Slaney
Programming: John Fryer
 "Baby Ray Baby"
Voice: Deirdre Rutkowski
Music: Ivo Watts-Russell
Programming: John Fryer
 "Several Times"
Voice: Deirdre Rutkowski
Violin: Gini Ball
Music: Pieter Nooten
Programming: John Fryer
 "The Lacemaker II"
Music: Ivo Watts-Russell
Strings: Martin McCarrick, Jocelyn Pook, Sally Herbert, Sonia Slaney
Programming: John Fryer
 "Late Night"
Voice: Caroline Crawley
Music: Jon Turner, Ivo Watts-Russell
 "Ruddy and Wretched"
Music: Ivo Watts-Russell
Programming: John Fryer
Guitar: Jim Williams
Voice: Anne Garrigues
 "Help Me Lift You Up"
Voices: Caroline Crawley, Deirdre Rutkowski
Music and programming: Jon Turner
 "Carolyn's Song"
Voice: Deirdre Rutkowski
Strings: Martin McCarrick, Jocelyn Pook, Sally Herbert, Sonia Slaney
Piano: Jon Turner
Guitar: Jim Williams
Drums: Rain Parade
 "D.D. and E."
Voice: Deirdre Rutkowski
Music: Ivo Watts-Russell
 "'Til I Gain Control Again"
Voices: Heidi Berry, Louise Rutkowski, Deirdre Rutkowski
Piano: Jon Turner
Strings: Martin McCarrick, Jocelyn Pook, Sally Herbert, Sonia Slaney
 "Dreams Are Like Water"
Voice: Deirdre Rutkowski
Music: Ivo Watts-Russell
Programming: John Fryer
 "I Am the Cosmos"
Voices: Dominic Appleton, Deirdre Rutkowski
Music and programming: Jon Turner
Guitar: Jim Williams
 "(Nothing But) Blood"
Voice: Deirdre Rutkowski
Music: Ivo Watts-Russell
Programming: John Fryer
 Produced by Ivo Watts-Russell
 Co-produced and engineered by John Fryer
 Additional engineering by Jon Turner
 Recorded at Blackwing Studios, London and Palladium Studios, Edinburgh
 Mixed at Blackwing Studios, London
 Mastering by Gus Shaw
 String arrangements by Martin McCarrick
 Sleeve design by Vaughan Oliver/v23
 Black and white photography by Nigel Grierson; colour photography by Claire Lazarus

References

1991 albums
4AD albums
Albums produced by John Fryer (producer)
Albums produced by Ivo Watts-Russell
This Mortal Coil albums